The XII Corps of the Grande Armée was a short-lived French military unit that existed during the Napoleonic Wars. The corps was formed in the spring of 1813 and Marshal Nicolas Oudinot was appointed as its commander. The formation included one Bavarian and two French infantry divisions. During the German campaign, the XII Corps was engaged at Lützen, Bautzen, and Luckau. After the summer 1813 armistice, the corps fought at Großbeeren and Dennewitz. After the latter action, Emperor Napoleon I dissolved the XII Corps and assigned its units to other formations. Oudinot found employment as a commander of two divisions of the Young Guard.

Order of battle

Bautzen, 1813
XII Corps: Marshal Nicolas Oudinot
 13th French Division: General of Division Michel-Marie Pacthod
 Brigade: General of Brigade Bernard Pourailly
 1st Light Infantry Regiment (4th Battalion)
 7th Line Infantry Regiment (3rd and 4th Battalions)
 10th Line Infantry Regiment (4th Battalion)
 42nd Line Infantry Regiment (4th Battalion)
 Brigade: General of Brigade Antoine Gruyer
 1st Neapolitan Light Infantry Regiment (2 battalions)
 101st Line Infantry Regiment (2nd, 3rd and 4th Battalions)
 14th French Division: General of Division Guillaume Latrille de Lorencez
 Brigade: General of Brigade Louis Nicolas Marin Leclerc des Essarts 
 52nd Line Infantry Regiment (3rd and 4th Battalions)
 137th Line Infantry Regiment (4 battalions)
 Brigade: General of Brigade François Nizard Charles Joseph d'Hénin 
 156th Line Infantry Regiment (4 battalions)
 Artillery: 2 foot artillery companies
 29th Bavarian Division: General-Leutnant Clemens von Raglovich
 Brigade: General-Major Karl von Beckers 
 1st Combined Light Infantry Battalion
 Prinz Karl Line Infantry Regiment Nr. 3 (2nd Battalion)
 Isenburg Line Infantry Regiment Nr. 4 (2nd Battalion)
 Herzog Pius Line Infantry Regiment Nr. 8 (2nd Battalion)
 Line Infantry Regiment Nr. 13 (Reserve Battalion)
 Brigade: Oberst Nikolaus von Maillot de la Treille
 2nd Combined Light Infantry Battalion
 Preysing Line Infantry Regiment Nr. 5 (2nd Battalion)
 Line Infantry Regiment Nr. 7 (2nd Battalion)
 Line Infantry Regiment Nr. 9 (2nd Battalion)
 Junker Line Infantry Regiment Nr. 10 (2nd Battalion)
 Divisional artillery and cavalry:
 3 foot artillery companies
 Combined Chevau-léger Regiment (3 squadrons)
Source:

References

GAI12